A Master of Science in Cyber Security is a type of postgraduate academic master's degree awarded by universities in many countries.  This degree is typically studied for in cyber security.  
What is offered by many institutions is actually called a Master in Strategic Cyber Operations and Information Management (SCOIM) which is commonly understood to be a Master in Cybersecurity.  This degree is offered by at least some universities in their Professional Studies program (GWU for one) so that it can be accomplished while students are employed - in other words it allows for "distance learning" or online attendance.  Requirements for the Professional Studies program include: 3.0 or better undergrad GPA, professional recommendations letters and an essay.

Curriculum Structure
The Master of Science in Cyber Security is a one to three years Master Degree, depending on the program, some may even start with two-year preparation classes and covers various areas of computer science, Internet security, Computer security, and or Information Assurance. Programs are offered online, on-campus, or a hybrid style. Please note that some schools offer the option of a graduate certificate in Cyber Security (for those not looking to do a full program). Other schools may offer a broader professional master's degree in a field of computing or business with a specialization is cyber security, cyber defense or information assurance. The National Initiative for Cybersecurity Education (NICE) has developed a framework for cyber security education and workforce development. Likewise, the National Centers of Academic Excellence in Cyber Defense (CAE-CD) framework was designed in a collaboration between the National Security Agency and the Department of Homeland Security.

Topics of study may include:

 Advanced persistent threat
 Advertising network
 Analytics
 Bulletproof hosting
 Browser security
 Certificate authority
 Computer ethics
 Computer forensics
 Computer insecurity
 Computer security
 Computer security policy
 Cryptography
 Cybercrime
 Cyber-collection
 Cyber ShockWave
 Cyber spying
 Cyber security standards
 Cyberpsychology
 Cyberterrorism
 Cyberwarfare in Russia
 Dark web
 Denial-of-service attack
 Digital forensics
 Economics of security
 Electronic warfare
 Fully undetectable
 Hacker (computer security)
 Industrial espionage
 Information assurance
 Information security
 Information warfare
 Internet governance
 IT risk
 iWar
 Legal aspects of computing
 License
 Malware
 Open-source bounty
 Password cracking
 Penetration test
 Phishing
 Privilege escalation
 Proactive Cyber Defence
 Quantum cryptography
 Remote administration software
 Sandbox (computer security)
 Security management
 Signals intelligence
 Swatting
 User Error
 Vulnerability
 Watering Hole
 Zero-day attack

See also 
 List of master's degrees
 List of cyber attack threat trends
 CERT Coordination Center
 Committee on National Security Systems
 IT risk#Standards organizations and standards
 National Security Directive
 National Strategy to Secure Cyberspace
 National Cyber Security Division
 United States Department of Homeland Security
 US-CERT

References

Master's degrees